The following is a comprehensive discography of the American-born Swiss singer Tina Turner. Turner's overall discography consists of ten studio albums, two live albums, two soundtracks, and five compilation albums.

Turner's career spans over five decades beginning with her first recording "Boxtop" in 1958. Widely recognized as the "Queen of Rock & Roll", Turner has sold more than 100 million records worldwide, making her one of the best-selling female artists in music history. Rolling Stone ranked her as the 17th Greatest Singer of all time and 63rd Greatest Artist of all time. She was the first artist to have a top 40 hit in seven consecutive decades in the UK. Private Dancer remains her career's biggest seller with 10 million copies sold worldwide. According to Recording Industry Association of America, Turner has sold 10 million certified albums in the US. She is also one of the best-selling female artists in the UK (9.6m) & Germany (6.3m).

Synopsis 
After joining Ike Turner's band as a background vocalist, the pair formed the duo, Ike & Tina Turner in 1960 and married in 1962. They released a series of major hits on the Billboard Hot 100 and R&B charts, including "A Fool In Love," "Proud Mary" and "Nutbush City Limits." Tina Turner's first credited single as a solo artist, "Too Many Ties That Bind"  was released from Ike Turner's Sonja Records label in 1964. Ike & Tina Turner remained intact until 1976 when their musical partnership ended, subsequently divorcing in 1978. By this time, Tina Turner had already released two solo albums, Tina Turns the Country On (1974) and Acid Queen (1975), on United Artists Records to which she and Ike Turner were signed. She then continued as a solo artist with the albums Rough (1978) and Love Explosion (1979). However, none of these releases were commercially successful, and Turner left the label at the end of the decade. After collaborating with the British electronic group, B.E.F. in 1982, Turner signed a new contract with EMI Records in the UK, and released the single "Let's Stay Together" (a cover of the Al Green song) in late 1983. Produced by B.E.F., the single was a UK Top 10 hit. Import copies began to sell well in the US which prompted Capitol Records (a subsidiary of EMI) to sign Turner and release the single there themselves, which made the Billboard Top 30 in Spring 1984. By this time, Turner had begun work on a full album, Private Dancer, which was released in May 1984 and became a worldwide hit. It spawned a string of hit singles, including "What's Love Got to Do with It", which still stands as Turner's biggest hit, peaking at No. 1 on the Billboard Hot 100 for three weeks. The success of the album established Turner as a major solo artist earning her a comeback that is widely regarded as one of the most successful of all time.

Following her success in 1984, Turner co-starred with Mel Gibson in the 1985 film, Mad Max Beyond Thunderdome. She recorded two songs for the film's soundtrack, with "We Don't Need Another Hero (Thunderdome)" giving her another huge international hit. She then released her second album for Capitol in 1986, Break Every Rule, which also spawned major hits on the US Hot 100, including "Typical Male" (No. 2) and "What You Get Is What You See" (No. 13). Turner embarked on a large scale world tour in 1987, and released her first live album, Tina Live in Europe, in 1988. She returned with her next studio album, Foreign Affair, in 1989. Its lead single, "The Best" was a worldwide hit that year and the album sold over 1.5 million copies in the United Kingdom alone.

Her first compilation album, Simply the Best, was released in 1991 and was another huge seller in the UK, selling over 2.4 million copies. Turner switched from the US Capitol label to Virgin Records (both were subsidiaries of EMI, and would later be merged by EMI to become the Capitol Music Group in 2007). In 1993, she recorded the soundtrack to the film about her life, What's Love Got to Do with It, producing the hit single, "I Don't Wanna Fight", her first US Top 10 hit since 1986. In 1995, she performed the title song for the James Bond film GoldenEye. Her next studio album was 1996's Wildest Dreams, followed by 1999's Twenty Four Seven, her last studio album to date.

On July 16, 2020, Turner released Foreign Affair: Deluxe Edition, which is a reissue of the original 1989 album and will include the original LP, a 1990 concert performance, B-sides, remixes, and more.

Albums

Studio albums

Soundtrack albums

Compilation albums

Live albums

Remix albums

Singles

1960s

1970s

1980s

1990s

2000s–2020s

As featured artist

Video albums

Music videos

Other appearances

Notes

References

External links
Swiss Charts - Tina Turner full Discography

Discography
Rhythm and blues discographies
Discographies of American artists
Soul music discographies